VfL-Stadion am Elsterweg (locally ) is a multi-use stadium in Wolfsburg, Germany. It was used mostly for football matches and hosted the home matches of VfL Wolfsburg. The stadium was able to hold 21,000 people and opened in 1948. It was closed in 2002 when Volkswagen Arena opened. Now it is used by Wolfsburg's 2nd squad, which plays in the Regionalliga Nord.

References

Football venues in Germany
VfL Wolfsburg
Buildings and structures in Wolfsburg
Sports venues in Lower Saxony